Julian Knight (born 5 January 1972) is a British politician and former journalist who has served as the Member of Parliament (MP) for Solihull since 2015. He is a member of the Conservative Party, but sits in the House of Commons as an independent since December 2022, having had the Conservative Party whip suspended after the Metropolitan Police received a referral involving allegations of sexual assault. Knight said he was "entirely innocent of any wrongdoing whatsoever".

Early life
Knight was born in 1972 in Chester. He grew up in a lone-parent family. He attended Chester Catholic High School, and went on to study History at the University of Hull, the first in his family to do so, and graduated with a 2:2.

Employment before Parliament
After university, Knight moved to London to find work, undertaking a variety of jobs before finding employment on a local newspaper. He later worked for the BBC as personal finance and consumer affairs reporter for five years until 2007, working across television, radio and online. In 2007 he became the Money and Property Editor of The Independent on Sunday.

In April 2015, Knight was criticised by Danny Alexander, Chief Secretary to the Treasury, for a book he authored eleven years earlier on tax avoidance. In his 2004 book, Wills, Probate and Inheritance Tax for Dummies, Knight "sets out ways that hardworking parents can pass on the graft of a lifetime" to their children. In the book, he was critical of the system of inheritance tax that existed at the point of publishing. He distinguished between personal tax avoidance, which he advised families on, and the "aggressive tax avoidance" of some multinational companies.

Political career
In 2014, Knight was selected to be the Conservative candidate for Solihull, a former Conservative safe seat which had been won by the Liberal Democrats in the 2005 General Election. At the  2015 general election Knight won the seat back for the Conservatives with a majority of 12,902, after an 11.9 per cent swing towards the Conservatives.

Prior to the 2016 UK referendum on European Union membership, Knight stated he would vote to remain in the EU. 

Knight defended his seat at the 2017 general election and was returned with an increased majority.

In January 2018, Knight was appointed Parliamentary Private Secretary at the Ministry of Justice providing support to Ministers. In September 2018 he moved to the Department for Work and Pensions before moving to HM Treasury in January 2019.

Knight also served as the Prime Ministerial Trade Envoy to Mongolia, where he formed part of a network of parliamentarians with the role of strengthening relations with foreign countries, and helping British businesses in accessing foreign markets. In April 2018, Knight made his first visit to the country as Trade Envoy. Knight made his final visit in September 2018, and left the post at a later date.

Knight defended his seat during the 2019 General Election. He increased his majority, this time to 21,273. Labour came second and the Liberal Democrats were placed third.

In December 2021, Knight said there was a "real sense of palpable loss" over the death of six-year-old Arthur Labinjo-Hughes in Solihull. Knight said the sentences given to the killers of the boy were too lenient and he would be referring the sentences to the Attorney General's Office for review under the unduly lenient sentence scheme.

In April 2022, following the Prime Minister Boris Johnson's apology after being given a fixed penalty notice for breaking Covid-19 regulations, Knight said that due to the Russian invasion of Ukraine it was "not the right time to change the leadership of the country."

On 7 December 2022, Knight was suspended as a Conservative MP after a complaint was made to the Metropolitan Police. A Conservative Party spokeswoman did not provide further details as it was under investigation. The following day, the Metropolitan Police said that it had received a report of "allegations of sexual assault against unnamed victims" on 28 October 2022 and after a further referral on 7 December 2022 had started an investigation. Knight stated he was "entirely innocent of any wrongdoing whatsoever". He said that he subsequently received "explicit threats involving blackmail as well as being at the centre of a campaign of rumour and innuendo" which was being dealt with by his lawyers.

Committees
From July 2015 to April 2017, Knight served as a member of the House of Commons Communities and Local Government Committee, during which time he co-sponsored the Government's Homelessness Reduction Act 2017.

Since December 2016 he has served on the Culture, Media, and Sport Select Committee, later the Digital, Culture, Media and Sport Select Committee. In that role he has made several high-profile interventions, including on the BBC gender pay row and against Facebook and digital company Cambridge Analytica during the committee's inquiry into 'fake news'.

In January 2020, Knight was elected as Chair of the Digital, Culture, Media and Sport Select Committee. Knight replaced Damian Collins as chairman. Damian Green is the Acting Chairman in the absence of Julian Knight.

Other work 

Knight has written books on a variety of subjects for the For Dummies series, including the Euro crisis, Retiring Wealthy and The Royal Wedding.

Personal life
Knight lives in Solihull. He is married to Philippa, a former nurse.

References

External links

1972 births
British journalists
Conservative Party (UK) MPs for English constituencies
Living people
The Independent people
UK MPs 2015–2017
UK MPs 2017–2019
UK MPs 2019–present
Alumni of the University of Hull
Independent members of the House of Commons of the United Kingdom